Wozzeck is a 1947 German drama film directed by Georg C. Klaren and starring Kurt Meisel, Max Eckard, and Helga Zülch. It is based on the play Woyzeck by Georg Büchner. (The play, which was first performed in 1913, nearly 80 years after Büchner's death, had been originally billed as Wozzeck due to a misreading of Büchner's handwriting.)

The film's sets were designed by Bruno Monden and Hermann Warm. It was shot at Babelsberg and the Althoff Studios in Potsdam.

Plot
Everything in town appears calm, placid, lovely. But Woyzeck, a rifleman assigned as an orderly, hears voices—the times are out of joint, at least in his cosmos. To his captain, Woyzeck is a comic marvel: ignorant but courageous and full of energy.

Main cast

References

Bibliography

External links 
 

1947 films
1940s German-language films
East German films
Films directed by Georg C. Klaren
German films based on plays
Films set in the 1830s
1940s historical drama films
German historical drama films
Films shot at Althoff Studios
Films shot at Babelsberg Studios
German black-and-white films
Works based on Woyzeck
1940s German films